Christos Nonis (born 13 June 1991) is a Greek professional footballer who plays as a centre-back for Zakynthos.

References

1991 births
Living people
Greek footballers
Greek expatriate footballers
Football League (Greece) players
Gamma Ethniki players
Tyrnavos 2005 F.C. players
Asteras Magoula F.C. players
A.P.S. Zakynthos players
Kallithea F.C. players
Chalkida F.C. players
Thesprotos F.C. players
Olympiacos Volos F.C. players
Association football defenders
Footballers from Larissa